Pomorski means Pomeranian in Polish. It is a masculine Polish surname with the feminine counterpart being Pomorska. The surname may refer to:
Edward Pomorski (1901–1995), the last Minister Plenipotentiary of the Polish Government-in-Exile
Jerzy Mikułowski Pomorski (1937–2020), Polish sociologist
John Pomorski (1905–1977), American baseball pitcher 
Mściwój II Pomorski (c. 1220–1294), Duke of Pomerelia

Places 
 Bay of Pomerania (Zatoka Pomorska)
 Pomeranian Wall (Wał Pomorski)
 Pomerania Tour (Pomorski Klasyk)
 Baj Pomorski Theatre, Toruń
 Pomeranian Philharmonic (Filharmonia Pomorska), Bydgoszcz

 Buk Pomorski
 Gołańcz Pomorska
 Nowogródek Pomorski
 Kalisz Pomorski
 Kamień Pomorski
 Kazimierz Pomorski
 Pomorska Wieś
 Serock Pomorski
 Wieleń Pomorski

 Pomorska Street, Bydgoszcz
 Pomorska, Kraków

Polish-language surnames
Ethnonymic surnames